The 1928 United States Senate election in Michigan was held on November 6, 1928 alongside a special election to the same seat. 

Democratic Senator Woodbridge N. Ferris died in office in March 1928. Governor Fred W. Green appointed newspaper publisher Arthur H. Vandenberg to fill Ferris's seat until a successor could be duly elected. Vandenberg won both the special election to complete Ferris's term and the regularly scheduled 1928 election, both held on November 6.

General election

Regular election

Candidates
John W. Bailey (Democratic)
David Boyd (Socialist Labor)
Ben A. Faulkner (Workers)
William L. Kreighoff (Socialist)
Duly McCone (Prohibition)
Arthur H. Vandenberg, interim appointee Senator (Republican)

Results

Special election

Candidates
John W. Bailey (Democratic)
Francis W. Elliott (Socialist)
Arthur H. Vandenberg, interim appointee Senator (Republican)

Results

See also 
 1928 United States Senate elections

References 

1928
Michigan
United States Senate
Michigan 1928
Michigan 1928
United States Senate 1928